James Louis Connolly (November 15, 1894 – September 12, 1986) was an American prelate of the Roman Catholic Church. He served as bishop of the Diocese of Fall River in Massachusetts from 1951 to 1970.

Biography

Early life 
James Connolly was born on November 15, 1894, in Fall River, Massachusetts, to Francis and Agnes (née McBride) Connolly. After graduating from B.M.C. Durfee High School in Fall River, he studied at St. Charles College in Catonsville, Maryland.  Connolly then entered the Sulpician Seminary in Washington, D.C.

Priesthood 
Connolly was ordained to the priesthood by Bishop Daniel Feehan for the Diocese of Providence on December 21, 1923. After his ordination, Connolly served as a curate at Our Lady of Lourdes Parish in Wellfleet, Massachusetts. 

In 1924, after being incardinated, or transferred, to the Archdiocese of St. Paul in Minnesota, Connolly entered Catholic University of Leuven in Leuven, Belgium. He earned a doctorate in historical science summa cum laude in 1928.  After receiving his doctorate, Connolly traveled to St. Paul, Minnesota, where he served as a professor and then rector of Nazareth Hall Preparatory Seminary from 1940-1943 and Saint Paul Seminary from 1943-1945.

Coadjutor Bishop and Bishop of Fall River 
On April 7, 1945, Connolly was appointed coadjutor bishop of the Diocese of Fall River and titular bishop of Mylasa by Pope Pius XII. He received his episcopal consecration on May 24, 1945, from Archbishop John Murray, with Bishops William O. Brady and Leo Binz serving as co-consecrators. In addition to his episcopal duties, he served as pastor of Sacred Heart Parish from 1945 to 1951. Upon the death of Bishop James Cassidy, Connolly automatically succeeded him as the fourth bishop of Fall River on May 17, 1951.

During his tenure as bishop, Connolly erected 15 new parishes, 17 schools, and 33 churches. He also established the following high schools in the diocese:

 Bishop Stang High School in North Dartmouth
 Bishop Feehan High School in Attleboro
 Bishop Cassidy High School in Taunton 
 Bishop Connolly High School in Fall River 

Connolly encouraged vocations, ordaining a total of 230 priests (130 for the diocese and 100 for religious communities) during his administration. He founded the diocesan newspaper, The Anchor, in 1957. He attended all four sessions of the Second Vatican Council in Rome between 1962 and 1965.

Retirement and legacy 
On October 30, 1970, Pope Paul VI accepted Connolly's resignation as bishop of Fall River and appointed him titular bishop of Thibuzabetum. He resigned his titular see on December 31, 1970. 

James Connolly died on September 12, 1986, at St. Anne's Hospital in Fall River, aged 91.

References

 

1894 births
1986 deaths
Participants in the Second Vatican Council
St. Charles College alumni
Catholic University of America alumni
Roman Catholic bishops of Fall River
20th-century Roman Catholic bishops in the United States
B.M.C. Durfee High School alumni